Hennadiy Semenovych Altman (born 22 May 1979) is a Ukrainian retired football goalkeeper and current manager.

Biography 
Hennadiy got his start in football at the FC Chornomorets Odessa youth school. He is the son of the Ukrainian coach Semen Altman, who is a former goalkeeper himself. Altman's professional career has been closely linked to his father's coaching career. He has moved to many clubs that were coached by his father. Over the years Hennadiy has played for FC Dynamo Odessa, FC Zimbru Chişinău, FC Mashinobudivnyk Druzhkivka, Metalurh Donetsk, FC Khimki, FC Chornomorets Odessa, FC Illychivets Mariupol, and PFC Olexandria. So far his longest playing stint has been with his home town team Chornomorets, which lasted 5 years. With Chornomorets Gennady he won the bronze medals in the 2005–06 season.

In 2002 Altman, along with his father moved to FC Chornomorets Odessa and was battling for the starting position with Vitaliy Rudenko. At the start of 2007, Altman left Ukraine to sign with Israeli club, Hakoah Maccabi Amidar/Ramat Gan where he would not count as a foreigner since he is Jewish. Media outlets reported that Altman left Ukraine due to some anti-semitic behavior of the football supporters in Ukraine. Altman played one Toto Cup match for Hakoah before being released. In the summer of 2007, along with his father, he moved to FC Illychivets Mariupol. After his father's unexpected firing in 2007 he was transferred to another Ukrainian First League club, PFC Olexandria.

Footnotes

External links 
Stats at Odessa Football 

1979 births
Living people
Footballers from Odesa
Jewish Ukrainian sportspeople
Ukrainian footballers
Ukrainian expatriate footballers
Expatriate footballers in Moldova
Expatriate footballers in Russia
Jewish footballers
Ukrainian football managers
FC Chornomorets Odesa players
Hakoah Maccabi Amidar Ramat Gan F.C. players
FC Khimki players
FC Mariupol players
FC Oleksandriya players
Ukrainian Premier League players
Association football goalkeepers
Odesa Jews